This is a List of clubs in the Oberliga Rheinland-Pfalz/Saar, including all clubs and their final placings from the inaugural season 1978–79, then under the name of Amateur-Oberliga Südwest, to the current one. The league, is the highest football league in the states of Rhineland-Palatinate (German: Rheinland-Pfalz) and Saarland. It is one of fourteen Oberligas in German football, the fifth tier of the German football league system. Until the introduction of the 3. Liga in 2008 it was the fourth tier of the league system, until the introduction of the Regionalligas in 1994 the third tier.

Overview
The league was formed in 1978 to replace the three regional amateur leagues that existed in its place until then as the third tier in Rhineland-Platinate and Saarland. Originally it carried the name Amateur-Oberliga Südwest. In 1994, when the Regionalliga Süd was formed, the league changed its official name once more to Oberliga Südwest, and became a tier four league. In 2012, the Regionalliga Süd was replaced by the Regionalliga Südwest and the league was renamed Oberliga Rheinland-Pfalz/Saar to avoid confusion, but little else changed for the Oberliga otherwise.

League timeline
The league went through the following timeline of name changes, format and position in the league system:

List of clubs
This is a complete list of clubs, as of the 2022–23 season, sorted by the last season a club played in the league:

Key

Notes
 1 1. FC Saarbrücken II was withdrawn from league football at the end of the 2014–15 season.
 2 Röchling Völklingen withdrew from league football during the 2021–22 season.

League placings
The complete list of clubs in the league and their league placings.

Amateur-Oberliga Südwest
The complete list of clubs and placings in the league while operating as the tier three Amateur-Oberliga Südwest from 1978 to 1994:

Oberliga Südwest
The complete list of clubs and placings in the league while operating as the tier four (1994–2008) and five (2008–2012) Oberliga Südwest:

Oberliga Rheinland-Pfalz/Saar
The complete list of clubs and placings in the league while operating as the tier five Oberliga Rheinland-Pfalz/Saar (2012–present):

Key

References

External links 
  Das deutsche Fussball Archiv Historic German league tables
  Weltfussball.de Round-by-round results and tables of the Oberliga Südwest from 1994 to 2012
  Weltfussball.de Round-by-round results and tables of the Oberliga Rheinland-Pfalz/Saar from 2012 onwards
  kicker.de: Oberliga Rheinland-Pfalz/Saar

Oberliga Rheinland-Pfalz/Saar
Football competitions in Rhineland-Palatinate
Football competitions in Saarland

Rheinland-Pfalz Saar